Oyon may refer to:
 Oyón Province, a province of the Lima Region, Peru
 Oyón, Peru, the capital of Oyón province, Peru
 Oyón-Oion, a municipality in Álava province, Spain